In computer science, false sharing is a performance-degrading usage pattern that can arise in systems with distributed, coherent caches at the size of the smallest resource block managed by the caching mechanism. When a system participant attempts to periodically access data that is not being altered by another party, but that data shares a cache block with data that is being altered, the caching protocol may force the first participant to reload the whole cache block despite a lack of logical necessity. The caching system is unaware of activity within this block and forces the first participant to bear the caching system overhead required by true shared access of a resource.

Multiprocessor CPU caches
By far the most common usage of this term is in modern multiprocessor CPU caches, where memory is cached in lines of some small power of two word size (e.g., 64 aligned, contiguous bytes). If two processors operate on independent data in the same memory address region storable in a single line, the cache coherency mechanisms in the system may force the whole line across the bus or interconnect with every data write, forcing memory stalls in addition to wasting system bandwidth. In some cases, the elimination of false sharing can result in order-of-magnitude performance improvements. False sharing is an inherent artifact of automatically synchronized cache protocols and can also exist in environments such as distributed file systems or databases, but current prevalence is limited to RAM caches.

Example
#include <iostream>
#include <thread>
#include <new>
#include <atomic>
#include <chrono>
#include <latch>
#include <vector>

using namespace std;
using namespace chrono;

#if defined(__cpp_lib_hardware_interference_size)
// default cacheline size from runtime
constexpr size_t CL_SIZE = hardware_constructive_interference_size;
#else
// most common cacheline size otherwise
constexpr size_t CL_SIZE = 64;
#endif

int main()
{
	vector<jthread> threads;
	int hc = thread::hardware_concurrency();
	for( int nThreads = 1; nThreads <= hc; ++nThreads )
	{
		latch latSync( nThreads );
		atomic_uint sync( nThreads );
		// as much atomics as would fit into a cacheline
		struct { atomic_char atomics[CL_SIZE] alignas(CL_SIZE); } cacheLine;
		atomic_int64_t nsSum( 0 ); // sum of both thread execution times
		for( int t = 0; t != nThreads; ++t )
			threads.emplace_back(
				[&]( atomic_char &a )
				{
					latSync.arrive_and_wait(); // synch beginning of thread execution on kernel-level
					if( sync.fetch_sub( 1, memory_order::relaxed ) != 1 ) // fine-synch on user-level
						while( sync.load( memory_order::relaxed ) );
					auto start = high_resolution_clock::now();
					for( size_t r = 10'000'000; r--)
						a.fetch_add( 1, memory_order::relaxed ); // atomic increment
					nsSum += duration_cast<nanoseconds>( high_resolution_clock::now() - start ).count();
				}, ref( cacheLine.atomics[t % CL_SIZE] ) );
		threads.resize( 0 ); // join all threads
		cout << nThreads << ": " << (int)(nsSum / (1.0e7 * nThreads) + 0.5) << endl;
	}
}
This code shows the effect of false sharing. It creates an increasing number of threads from one thread to the number of physical threads in the system. Each thread sequentially increments one byte of a cache line atomically, which as a whole is shared among all threads. The higher the level of contention between threads, the longer each increment takes. This are the results on a Zen1 system with eight cores and sixteen threads:
1: 6
2: 22
3: 33
4: 44
5: 71
6: 76
7: 102
8: 118
9: 131
10: 142
11: 159
12: 189
13: 209
14: 229
15: 248
16: 262
As you can see, on the system in question it can take up to a quarter microsecond to complete an increment operation on the shared cache line, which corresponds to approx. 1,000 clock cycles on this CPU.

Mitigation
There are ways of mitigating the effects of false sharing. For instance, false sharing in CPU caches can be prevented by reordering variables or adding padding (unused bytes) between variables. However, some of these program changes may increase the size of the objects, leading to higher memory use. Compile-time data transformations can also mitigate false-sharing. However, some of these transformations may not always be allowed. For instance, the C++ programming language standard draft of C++23 mandates that data members must be laid out so that later members have higher addresses.

There are tools for detecting false sharing. There are also systems that both detect and repair false sharing in executing programs. However, these systems incur some execution overhead.

References

External links
 Easy Understanding on False Sharing
 C++ today blog, False Sharing hits again!
 Dr Dobbs article: Eliminate False Sharing
 Be careful when trying to eliminate false sharing in Java

Cache coherency
Computer memory